Jennifer Wood (born 4 August 1972) is a Canadian gymnast. She competed in six events at the 1992 Summer Olympics.

References

External links
 

1972 births
Living people
Canadian female artistic gymnasts
Olympic gymnasts of Canada
Gymnasts at the 1992 Summer Olympics
Sportspeople from Edmonton
Pan American Games medalists in gymnastics
Pan American Games bronze medalists for Canada
Gymnasts at the 1991 Pan American Games
Medalists at the 1991 Pan American Games
20th-century Canadian women
21st-century Canadian women